David Tomaszewski, born 6 October 1984) is a French music video director and digital artist of Polish descent. He is the son of Polish pianist Marek Tomaszewski and Polish painter Agata Preyzner.
He has 2 children with life partner and actress Naila Mansour.

Videography

Filmography

Awards

References

 https://filmschoolrejects.com/youth-beauty-and-other-terrors-make-cobalt-a-must-see-film-8cce9341302d#.svu0lob86
 https://www.bleedingcool.com/2016/12/05/filmmaker-david-tomaszewski-wants-create-french-clockwork-orange/
 http://onesmallwindow.com/interviews/interview-with-david-tomaszewski-writerdirector-of-cobalt/
 http://www.fubiz.net/en/tv/cobalt-by-david-tomaszewski-trailer-2/

External links 
 
 

1984 births
Living people
French music video directors
French people of Polish descent
French digital artists
Orelsan